The Moose River Site is a prehistoric archaeological site in Kenai Peninsula Borough, Alaska.  Located near the confluence of the Kenai and Moose Rivers near Sterling, it is apparently a camp or village site that was used as a fishing camp about 1500 years ago.  The site includes seven house pits and three food cache pits.

The site was listed on the National Register of Historic Places in 1978.

See also
National Register of Historic Places listings in Kenai Peninsula Borough, Alaska

References

Archaeological sites on the National Register of Historic Places in Alaska
Kenai Peninsula Borough, Alaska
National Register of Historic Places in Kenai Peninsula Borough, Alaska